This is a list of loanwords of Latin origin which entered the Greek language during the Byzantine era.

Augousta, honorific term for the Empress
Chartoularios tou kanikleiou, one of the most senior offices in the Byzantine imperial chancery
Kouropalates, a court title
Domestikos, a civil, ecclesiastic and military office
Doukas, the name of a Byzantine Greek noble family, from the Latin title dux
Droungarios, a military rank
Magistros, a ministerial title
Magnaura, a large building in Constantinople, possibly from Latin Magna Aula, "Great Hall"
Optimatoi, a military unit
Patrikios, the Patrician caste
Phelonion, a liturgical vestment
Praipositos, a senior palace title
Primikerios, a title applied to heads of departments and colleges
Protonotarios, head of the colleges of the notarioi 
Rousioi, the "Reds", team in chariot racing
Sakellarios, an official with administrative and financial duties 
Silentiarios, a class of courtiers
Tourma, administrative sub-division of a thema
Varvatos, term meaning "bearded"
Venetoi, the "Blues", team in chariot racing
Vestiarion, a major fiscal department

Greek Latin
 List of Byzantine Latin
Byzantine Latin
 Greek Byzantine